Paralepistemon is a genus of flowering plants belonging to the family Convolvulaceae.

Its native range is Southern Congo to KwaZulu-Natal.

Species:

Paralepistemon curtoi 
Paralepistemon shirensis

References

Convolvulaceae
Convolvulaceae genera